Jefferson Avenue Historic District may refer to:

 Jefferson Avenue Historic District (Columbus, Ohio), listed on the National Register of Historic Places (NRHP) in Columbus, Ohio
 Jefferson Avenue Historic District (Ogden, Utah), NRHP-listed in Weber County
 Jefferson Avenue Historic District (Janesville, Wisconsin), NRHP-listed in Rock County